Soldanella villosa is a species of flowering plant in the family Primulaceae, native to the western Pyrenees. It has gained the Royal Horticultural Society's Award of Garden Merit as an ornamental.

References

Primulaceae
Flora of France
Flora of Spain
Plants described in 1850